Lucifer, in comics, may refer to:

Lucifer (DC Comics), a comic book series and character from DC Comics's Vertigo line
Lucifer (Marvel Comics), a comic book supervillain from the Marvel Universe
Lucifer (Image Comics), a comic book god from The Wicked + The Divine
A comic by Eddie Campbell and Phil Elliott, published by Trident Comics
A Chaos Comics character who has appeared in Lady Death and Evil Ernie

See also
Lucifer (disambiguation)
Lucifera (comics), an Italian comic character
Satan (comics), a number of other characters based on the Devil

References